The 1987–88 La Salle Explorers men's basketball team represented La Salle University during the 1987–88 NCAA Division I men's basketball season.

Roster

Regular season

Player stats

NCAA tournament
Midwest
 Kansas State (#4 seed) 66, La Salle (#13 seed) 53

Awards and honors
 Lionel Simmons, First Team All-Big 5 selection 
 Lionel Simmons, Robert V. Geasey Trophy
 Lionel Simmons, Metro Atlantic Athletic Conference Player of the Year

References

La Salle Explorers men's basketball seasons
La Salle Explorers
La Salle
La
La